This is the List of Julie Anne San Jose concerts, tours and shows in the Philippines and abroad. Julie Anne San Jose is a Filipino artist.

References 

San Jose, Julie Anne